Plasmodium minasense is a parasite of the genus Plasmodium subgenus Carinamoeba.

Like all Plasmodium species P. minasense has both vertebrate and insect hosts. The vertebrate hosts for this parasite are lizards.

Taxonomy 
The original description of this species was by Carini and Rudolphi in 1912 in a lizard Mabuia agilis. Since then a number of subspecies of P. minasense have been described.

The diagnostic features of P. minasense are:

The schizonts are smaller than normal erythrocyte nuclei.
Schzonts produce 4-8 merozoites
The gametocytes are equal to or smaller than erythrocyte nuclei in size and round in shape
They infect hosts of the lizard families Scincidae, Iguanidae and Teiidae in the Neotropics

It is currently thought that P. minasense is closely related to Plasmodium floridense and  Plasmodium tropiduri. Like much of the taxonomy in this genus this opinion may need to be revised once the species have been subjected to DNA analysis.

Subspecies
Subspecies are currently named on the basis of the hosts infected. This criterion may be subject to revision when DNA based taxonomy is applied to this species complex. The subspecies currently recognised include:

P. minasense anolisi
P. minasense calcaratae
P. minasense capitoi
P. minasense carinii
P. minasense diminutivum
P. minasense minasense
P. minasense plicae
P. minasense tegui

P. minasense anolisi 
Described by Telford in 1979

Distribution
Found in Panama, Central America and the Caribbean.

Hosts
Known hosts include the lizards Anolis cybotes, Anolis distichus, Anolis frenatus and Anolis limifrons

P. minasense calcaratae 
This subspecies was described by Telford and Telford in 2003.

It is characterized by very small, usually fan-shaped, schizonts that average 3.4 × 2.6 micrometres (range: 2.5 – 4.5 × 2.0 – 3.0). The schizonts produce 3.9 (range: 3 – 4) merozoites.

The gametocytes are spherical or ovoid averaging 6.7 × 5.0 micrometres (range: 4.5 – 9.0 × 3.0 – 7.0) in size with a length-width product of 33.7 (range: 15 – 54) and a length/width ratio of 1.4 (range: 1.0 – 2.3). By dimension they are not sexual dimorphic.

Distribution
Found in Venezuela, South America.

Hosts
The only known host is the lizard Kentropyx calcarata

P. minasense capitoi 
This subspecies was described by Telford in 1979.

Distribution
Found in Panama, Central America.

Hosts
The only known host is the lizard Anolis capito

P. minasense carinii 
This subspecies was described by Leger and Mouzels in 1917

Distribution
Found in coastal South America.

Hosts
The only known host is the lizard Iguana iguana

P. minasense diminutivum 
This subspecies was described by Telford in 1973

Distribution
Found in Panama, Central America.

Hosts
The only known host is the lizard Ameiva ameiva

P. minasense minasense 
This is recognised as the type species. It was described by Carini and Rudolphi in 1912 in a lizard Mabuya agilis.

Distribution
Found in Brazil, Central America.

Hosts
Known hosts include the lizards Mabuya agilis and Mabuya mabouya.

P. minasense plicae 
This subspecies was described by Telford in 1979.

Distribution
Found in Guyana, South America.

Hosts
The only known host is the lizard Plica umbra

P. minasense tegui

Distribution
Found in Venezuela, South America.

Hosts
The only known host is the lizard Tupinambis teguixin

References 

minasense